The Braille pattern dots-12 is a 6-dot or 8-dot braille cell with the top two left dots raised. It is represented by the Unicode code point U+2803, and in Braille ASCII with "B".

Unified Braille

In unified international braille, the braille pattern dots-12 is used to represent a voiced bilabial plosive, ie /b/, and is otherwise assigned as needed. It is also used for the number 2.

Table of unified braille values

Other braille

Plus dots 7 and 8

Related to Braille pattern dots-12 are Braille patterns 127, 128, and 1278, which are used in 8-dot braille systems, such as Gardner-Salinas and Luxembourgish Braille.

Related 8-dot kantenji patterns

In the Japanese kantenji braille, the standard 8-dot Braille patterns 23, 123, 234, and 1234 are the 8-dot braille patterns related to Braille pattern dots-12, since the two additional dots of kantenji patterns 012, 127, and 0127 are placed above the base 6-dot cell, instead of below, as in standard 8-dot braille.

Kantenji using braille patterns 23, 123, 234, or 1234

This listing includes kantenji using Braille pattern dots-12 for all 6349 kanji found in JIS C 6226-1978.

  - 糸

Variants and thematic compounds

  -  い/糹/#2 + selector 2  =  丼
  -  selector 2 + い/糹/#2  =  韋
  -  selector 4 + い/糹/#2  =  離
  -  selector 4 + selector 4 + い/糹/#2  =  隹
  -  selector 5 + い/糹/#2  =  井
  -  selector 6 + い/糹/#2  =  尹
  -  数 + #2  =  二
  -  囗 + い/糹/#2  =  弐
  -  ん/止 + い/糹/#2  =  正
  -  せ/食 + い/糹/#2  =  生

Compounds of 糸

  -  い/糹/#2 + さ/阝  =  糾
  -  い/糹/#2 + き/木  =  紀
  -  い/糹/#2 + も/門  =  約
  -  く/艹 + い/糹/#2 + も/門  =  葯
  -  い/糹/#2 + か/金  =  紆
  -  い/糹/#2 + ふ/女  =  純
  -  い/糹/#2 + ろ/十  =  紘
  -  い/糹/#2 + ん/止  =  紙
  -  い/糹/#2 + ゐ/幺  =  級
  -  い/糹/#2 + り/分  =  紛
  -  い/糹/#2 + ほ/方  =  紡
  -  い/糹/#2 + た/⽥  =  細
  -  い/糹/#2 + た/⽥ + selector 4  =  紬
  -  い/糹/#2 + た/⽥ + ゐ/幺  =  縲
  -  い/糹/#2 + し/巿  =  紳
  -  い/糹/#2 + ぬ/力  =  紹
  -  い/糹/#2 + す/発  =  終
  -  い/糹/#2 + そ/馬  =  組
  -  い/糹/#2 + は/辶  =  絆
  -  い/糹/#2 + け/犬  =  経
  -  い/糹/#2 + ち/竹  =  絞
  -  い/糹/#2 + れ/口  =  絡
  -  い/糹/#2 + と/戸  =  絣
  -  い/糹/#2 + 囗  =  給
  -  い/糹/#2 + 龸  =  統
  -  い/糹/#2 + 龸 + ち/竹  =  纐
  -  い/糹/#2 + 龸 + ゐ/幺  =  絃
  -  い/糹/#2 + え/訁  =  絵
  -  い/糹/#2 + ら/月  =  絹
  -  す/発 + い/糹/#2 + ら/月  =  羂
  -  い/糹/#2 + の/禾  =  継
  -  い/糹/#2 + の/禾 + た/⽥  =  繙
  -  い/糹/#2 + い/糹/#2 + の/禾  =  繼
  -  い/糹/#2 + つ/土  =  続
  -  い/糹/#2 + つ/土 + れ/口  =  纈
  -  い/糹/#2 + い/糹/#2 + つ/土  =  續
  -  い/糹/#2 + ゆ/彳  =  綱
  -  い/糹/#2 + こ/子  =  総
  -  い/糹/#2 + い/糹/#2 + こ/子  =  總
  -  い/糹/#2 + 氷/氵  =  線
  -  い/糹/#2 + ま/石  =  締
  -  い/糹/#2 + へ/⺩  =  編
  -  い/糹/#2 + 仁/亻  =  緩
  -  い/糹/#2 + ひ/辶  =  練
  -  い/糹/#2 + め/目  =  縄
  -  い/糹/#2 + ⺼  =  縊
  -  い/糹/#2 + て/扌  =  縛
  -  い/糹/#2 + よ/广 =  縦
  -  い/糹/#2 + い/糹/#2 + よ/广  =  縱
  -  い/糹/#2 + 宿  =  縮
  -  い/糹/#2 + る/忄  =  縷
  -  い/糹/#2 + を/貝  =  績
  -  い/糹/#2 + を/貝 + け/犬  =  纉
  -  い/糹/#2 + や/疒  =  繃
  -  い/糹/#2 + み/耳  =  繊
  -  い/糹/#2 + い/糹/#2 + み/耳  =  纖
  -  い/糹/#2 + 日  =  織
  -  い/糹/#2 + せ/食  =  繕
  -  い/糹/#2 + う/宀/#3  =  繰
  -  い/糹/#2 + む/車  =  繭
  -  い/糹/#2 + い/糹/#2 + い/糹/#2  =  絲
  -  い/糹/#2 + い/糹/#2 + け/犬  =  經
  -  い/糹/#2 + い/糹/#2 + め/目  =  繩
  -  い/糹/#2 + い/糹/#2 + え/訁  =  繪
  -  い/糹/#2 + selector 6 + し/巿  =  絏
  -  い/糹/#2 + selector 6 + み/耳  =  絽
  -  い/糹/#2 + selector 4 + な/亻  =  紿
  -  い/糹/#2 + selector 4 + の/禾  =  緞
  -  い/糹/#2 + 龸 + selector 3  =  紊
  -  い/糹/#2 + 宿 + を/貝  =  糺
  -  い/糹/#2 + 比 + し/巿  =  紂
  -  い/糹/#2 + 宿 + 比  =  紕
  -  い/糹/#2 + ほ/方 + そ/馬  =  紗
  -  い/糹/#2 + 宿 + え/訁  =  紜
  -  い/糹/#2 + き/木 + を/貝  =  紮
  -  い/糹/#2 + ろ/十 + よ/广  =  紲
  -  い/糹/#2 + 数 + て/扌  =  紵
  -  い/糹/#2 + 囗 + れ/口  =  絅
  -  い/糹/#2 + よ/广 + こ/子  =  絋
  -  い/糹/#2 + 宿 + ゆ/彳  =  絎
  -  い/糹/#2 + 龸 + selector 2  =  絖
  -  い/糹/#2 + 仁/亻 + ゆ/彳  =  絛
  -  い/糹/#2 + 日 + す/発  =  絢
  -  い/糹/#2 + 宿 + 囗  =  絨
  -  い/糹/#2 + ふ/女 + れ/口  =  絮
  -  い/糹/#2 + の/禾 + ゐ/幺  =  綉
  -  い/糹/#2 + ふ/女 + 龸  =  綏
  -  い/糹/#2 + い/糹/#2 + け/犬  =  經
  -  い/糹/#2 + ぬ/力 + 心  =  綛
  -  い/糹/#2 + う/宀/#3 + ね/示  =  綜
  -  い/糹/#2 + と/戸 + け/犬  =  綟
  -  い/糹/#2 + 囗 + つ/土  =  綢
  -  い/糹/#2 + け/犬 + さ/阝  =  綣
  -  い/糹/#2 + 龸 + 囗  =  綫
  -  い/糹/#2 + と/戸 + れ/口  =  綮
  -  い/糹/#2 + 宿 + と/戸  =  綯
  -  い/糹/#2 + う/宀/#3 + ら/月  =  綰
  -  い/糹/#2 + 宿 + ち/竹  =  綵
  -  い/糹/#2 + 宿 + る/忄  =  綸
  -  い/糹/#2 + け/犬 + か/金  =  綺
  -  い/糹/#2 + う/宀/#3 + よ/广  =  綻
  -  い/糹/#2 + 日 + と/戸  =  綽
  -  い/糹/#2 + 宿 + す/発  =  綾
  -  い/糹/#2 + ら/月 + た/⽥  =  緇
  -  い/糹/#2 + さ/阝 + 龸  =  緕
  -  い/糹/#2 + ひ/辶 + selector 3  =  緘
  -  い/糹/#2 + 宿 + み/耳  =  緝
  -  い/糹/#2 + み/耳 + ん/止  =  緡
  -  い/糹/#2 + 宿 + よ/广  =  緤
  -  い/糹/#2 + め/目 + selector 4  =  緬
  -  い/糹/#2 + 氷/氵 + ゆ/彳  =  緻
  -  い/糹/#2 + ひ/辶 + ふ/女  =  縅
  -  い/糹/#2 + 日 + ひ/辶  =  縉
  -  い/糹/#2 + そ/馬 + こ/子  =  縒
  -  い/糹/#2 + し/巿 + ろ/十  =  縟
  -  い/糹/#2 + う/宀/#3 + ま/石  =  縡
  -  い/糹/#2 + 宿 + ま/石  =  縵
  -  い/糹/#2 + に/氵 + ね/示  =  縹
  -  い/糹/#2 + ひ/辶 + む/車  =  縺
  -  い/糹/#2 + 心 + ま/石  =  縻
  -  い/糹/#2 + む/車 + selector 2  =  繆
  -  い/糹/#2 + ぬ/力 + ゆ/彳  =  繍
  -  い/糹/#2 + ら/月 + 氷/氵  =  繖
  -  い/糹/#2 + も/門 + ら/月  =  繝
  -  い/糹/#2 + 宿 + つ/土  =  繞
  -  い/糹/#2 + ゆ/彳 + む/車  =  繦
  -  い/糹/#2 + ち/竹 + え/訁  =  繧
  -  い/糹/#2 + い/糹/#2 + め/目  =  繩
  -  い/糹/#2 + い/糹/#2 + え/訁  =  繪
  -  い/糹/#2 + ち/竹 + の/禾  =  繻
  -  い/糹/#2 + う/宀/#3 + を/貝  =  繽
  -  い/糹/#2 + す/発 + ⺼  =  繿
  -  い/糹/#2 + 宿 + さ/阝  =  纃
  -  い/糹/#2 + 龸 + み/耳  =  纎
  -  い/糹/#2 + ふ/女 + を/貝  =  纓
  -  い/糹/#2 + ぬ/力 + 宿  =  纔
  -  い/糹/#2 + め/目 + す/発  =  纜

Compounds of 韋

  -  な/亻 + い/糹/#2  =  偉
  -  心 + い/糹/#2  =  葦
  -  ひ/辶 + い/糹/#2  =  違
  -  ゐ/幺 + い/糹/#2  =  緯
  -  囗 + 宿 + い/糹/#2  =  圍
  -  し/巿 + 宿 + い/糹/#2  =  幃
  -  え/訁 + 宿 + い/糹/#2  =  諱
  -  ろ/十 + 宿 + い/糹/#2  =  韓
  -  い/糹/#2 + 宿 + ぬ/力  =  韜

Compounds of 離 and 隹

  -  に/氵 + selector 4 + い/糹/#2  =  漓
  -  へ/⺩ + selector 4 + い/糹/#2  =  璃
  -  お/頁 + selector 4 + い/糹/#2  =  魑
  -  の/禾 + selector 4 + い/糹/#2  =  黐
  -  う/宀/#3 + selector 4 + い/糹/#2  =  寉
  -  囗 + selector 4 + い/糹/#2  =  雕
  -  ち/竹 + selector 4 + い/糹/#2  =  霍
  -  仁/亻 + い/糹/#2  =  催
  -  氷/氵 + い/糹/#2  =  准
  -  も/門 + 氷/氵 + い/糹/#2  =  匯
  -  れ/口 + い/糹/#2  =  唯
  -  つ/土 + い/糹/#2  =  堆
  -  け/犬 + い/糹/#2  =  奪
  -  し/巿 + い/糹/#2  =  帷
  -  る/忄 + い/糹/#2  =  惟
  -  る/忄 + い/糹/#2 + 火  =  憔
  -  み/耳 + い/糹/#2  =  截
  -  て/扌 + い/糹/#2  =  推
  -  ま/石 + い/糹/#2  =  確
  -  の/禾 + い/糹/#2  =  稚
  -  い/糹/#2 + い/糹/#2  =  維
  -  す/発 + い/糹/#2  =  羅
  -  心 + す/発 + い/糹/#2  =  蘿
  -  ひ/辶 + す/発 + い/糹/#2  =  邏
  -  か/金 + す/発 + い/糹/#2  =  鑼
  -  え/訁 + い/糹/#2  =  誰
  -  か/金 + い/糹/#2  =  錐
  -  ほ/方 + い/糹/#2  =  雀
  -  め/目 + い/糹/#2  =  雅
  -  き/木 + い/糹/#2  =  集
  -  ね/示 + き/木 + い/糹/#2  =  襍
  -  と/戸 + い/糹/#2  =  雇
  -  比 + い/糹/#2  =  雌
  -  龸 + い/糹/#2  =  雑
  -  龸 + 龸 + い/糹/#2  =  雜
  -  む/車 + い/糹/#2  =  雖
  -  も/門 + い/糹/#2  =  雛
  -  く/艹 + い/糹/#2  =  難
  -  な/亻 + く/艹 + い/糹/#2  =  儺
  -  て/扌 + く/艹 + い/糹/#2  =  攤
  -  に/氵 + く/艹 + い/糹/#2  =  灘
  -  い/糹/#2 + ゑ/訁  =  隻
  -  め/目 + い/糹/#2 + ゑ/訁  =  矍
  -  ろ/十 + い/糹/#2  =  雄
  -  い/糹/#2 + 火  =  焦
  -  心 + い/糹/#2 + 火  =  蕉
  -  き/木 + い/糹/#2 + 火  =  樵
  -  れ/口 + 宿 + い/糹/#2  =  售
  -  や/疒 + う/宀/#3 + い/糹/#2  =  崔
  -  て/扌 + 宿 + い/糹/#2  =  摧
  -  る/忄 + 宿 + い/糹/#2  =  懼
  -  心 + 宿 + い/糹/#2  =  椎
  -  に/氵 + 宿 + い/糹/#2  =  淮
  -  ま/石 + 宿 + い/糹/#2  =  碓
  -  ち/竹 + う/宀/#3 + い/糹/#2  =  籬
  -  心 + う/宀/#3 + い/糹/#2  =  藺
  -  ゆ/彳 + 宿 + い/糹/#2  =  衢
  -  い/糹/#2 + 宿 + ろ/十  =  隼
  -  い/糹/#2 + 比 + 囗  =  雋
  -  か/金 + 宿 + い/糹/#2  =  鐫
  -  な/亻 + 宿 + い/糹/#2  =  儁
  -  め/目 + 宿 + い/糹/#2  =  雎
  -  そ/馬 + 宿 + い/糹/#2  =  騅
  -  い/糹/#2 + 宿 + せ/食  =  鷦

Compounds of 井

  -  た/⽥ + selector 5 + い/糹/#2  =  畊
  -  こ/子 + い/糹/#2  =  耕
  -  い/糹/#2 + う/宀/#3 + り/分  =  穽
  -  ほ/方 + selector 5 + い/糹/#2  =  舛
  -  き/木 + selector 5 + い/糹/#2  =  桝

Compounds of 尹

  -  ち/竹 + selector 6 + い/糹/#2  =  笋
  -  い/糹/#2 + な/亻  =  伊

Compounds of 二

  -  ち/竹 + 宿 + い/糹/#2  =  竺

Compounds of 弐

  -  selector 1 + 囗 + い/糹/#2  =  弍
  -  ⺼ + 囗 + い/糹/#2  =  膩
  -  囗 + 囗 + い/糹/#2  =  貳
  -  selector 4 + 囗 + い/糹/#2  =  貮

Compounds of 正

  -  ゆ/彳 + い/糹/#2  =  征
  -  や/疒 + い/糹/#2  =  症
  -  ゑ/訁 + い/糹/#2  =  証
  -  心 + ん/止 + い/糹/#2  =  柾
  -  ふ/女 + ん/止 + い/糹/#2  =  歪
  -  か/金 + ん/止 + い/糹/#2  =  鉦

Compounds of 生

  -  ふ/女 + い/糹/#2  =  姓
  -  日 + い/糹/#2  =  星
  -  せ/食 + 日 + い/糹/#2  =  醒
  -  る/忄 + 日 + い/糹/#2  =  惺
  -  け/犬 + 日 + い/糹/#2  =  猩
  -  ⺼ + 日 + い/糹/#2  =  腥
  -  そ/馬 + い/糹/#2  =  牲
  -  よ/广 + い/糹/#2  =  産
  -  ゆ/彳 + せ/食 + い/糹/#2  =  徃
  -  ほ/方 + せ/食 + い/糹/#2  =  旌
  -  な/亻 + せ/食 + い/糹/#2  =  甦
  -  ち/竹 + せ/食 + い/糹/#2  =  笙

Other compounds

  -  た/⽥ + い/糹/#2  =  対
  -  た/⽥ + た/⽥ + い/糹/#2  =  對
  -  う/宀/#3 + い/糹/#2  =  彙
  -  は/辶 + い/糹/#2  =  拝
  -  は/辶 + は/辶 + い/糹/#2  =  拜
  -  に/氵 + は/辶 + い/糹/#2  =  湃
  -  に/氵 + い/糹/#2  =  湿
  -  ⺼ + い/糹/#2  =  胤
  -  さ/阝 + い/糹/#2  =  降
  -  ゑ/訁 + ゑ/訁 + い/糹/#2  =  證
  -  に/氵 + に/氵 + い/糹/#2  =  濕
  -  さ/阝 + 宿 + い/糹/#2  =  隰

Notes

Braille patterns